{{Speciesbox
| image =
| status = LC
| status_system = IUCN3.1
| status_ref = <ref name="iucn status 11 November 2021">{{cite iucn |authors=Colli, G.R., Fenker, J., Tedeschi, L., Bataus, Y.S.L., Uhlig, V.M., Lima, A., Nogueira, C. de C., Borges-Nojosa, D.M., Costa, G.C., de Moura, G.J.B., Winck, G., Silva, J.R.S., Viñas, L.V., Ribeiro Júnior, M.A., Hoogmoed, M.S., Tinôco, M.S.T., Almeida-Santos, P., Valadão, R., de Oliveira, R.B., Avila-Pires, T.C.S., Ferreira, V.L. & de Menezes, V.A.  |date=2021 |title='Tropidurus pinima |volume=2021|page=e.T49845652A159255522|url=https://www.iucnredlist.org/species/49845652/159255522|access-date=16 December 2021}}</ref> 
| genus = Tropidurus
| species = pinima
| authority = (Rodrigues, 1984)
}}Tropidurus pinima'' is a species of lizard of the Tropiduridae family. It is found in Brazil.

References

Tropidurus
Reptiles described in 1984
Endemic fauna of Brazil
Reptiles of Brazil
Taxa named by Miguel Trefaut Rodrigues